Codename: Kids Next Door is an American animated television series created by Mr. Warburton for Cartoon Network and distributed by Warner Bros. Domestic Television. The series follows the adventures of a diverse group of five 10-year-old children who operate from a high-tech treehouse, fighting against adult and teen villains with advanced 2×4 technology. Using their code names (Numbers 1, 2, 3, 4, and 5), they are Sector V, part of a global organization called the Kids Next Door.

The series' pilot premiered on Cartoon Network in mid-2001 as part of The Big Pick II, a special broadcast event showcasing 11 pilots for different series. The winner of a viewers' poll by Cartoon Network would decide which pilot would be greenlit to be a full series. After winning the poll, the series premiered on December 6, 2002, and concluded on January 21, 2008, after six seasons and 78 episodes. Two television films were broadcast: Operation: Z.E.R.O., which aired in 2006, and Operation: I.N.T.E.R.V.I.E.W.S., which aired as the series finale in 2008. A special half-hour crossover episode with fellow Cartoon Network series, The Grim Adventures of Billy & Mandy, aired in 2007.

Spin-off media include two video games, Operation S.O.D.A. and Operation V.I.D.E.O.G.A.M.E., as well as a trading card game, comic books, and DVD releases. Codename: Kids Next Door has also appeared in DVD anthologies and compilation video games from Cartoon Network.

Overview

Synopsis
The show revolves around a group of five 10-year old kids (later retconned to be varying ages), using codenames Numbers 1 through 5, who are the main home operatives of what is known as Sector V, which is part of a worldwide espionage-style organization called the Kids Next Door. Their mission is to fight crimes against kids (such as homework and flossing), many of which are willingly committed by "evil" adults, senior citizens, teenagers, and other children. Numbuh 1 is the bald, astute, no-nonsense, workaholic British-American boy Nigel Uno, leader of Sector V. Numbuh 2 is the overweight, intellectual, aviation enthusiastic, pun-cracking Jewish-American boy Hoagie P. Gilligan, Jr.. Numbuh 3 is the happy-go-lucky Japanese-American girl Kuki Sanban. Numbuh 4 is the short-tempered, irrational, and fighting-prone Australian-American boy Wallabee Beatles. Numbuh 5 is the intelligent, laid-back, tomboyish African-American girl Abigail Lincoln.

Following a period of training, every member of the Kids Next Door chooses a number or alphanumeric code (deliberately pronounced and spelled as "Numbuh") and is sent to a "sector" that acts as their home base. The sector headquarters, like some of the organization's bases and facilities, are tree houses, with both treehouse and the tree it is in being of ludicrous proportions, and often suited to their environment. This includes a base constructed beneath the Arctic ice shelf, and a base built into a large pine tree. The main headquarters of the Kids Next Door is a treehouse Moon Base. The Kids Next Door follow their oath of protecting other kids as well as battling adulthood until the age of 13 when they are "decommissioned", a process of wiping their memories of any past KND activity and warping their minds. Such a practice has inevitably led to the creation of many KND villains who escaped decommissioning (such as Numbuh 5's older sister Cree, formerly known as Numbuh 11, and Chad, formerly known as Numbuh 274 and supreme commander of the Kids Next Door).

The practice of strict decommissioning at age 13 was later on revealed to be subject to exceptions: kids who are deemed exceptional agents are offered the chance to carry on in KND as spies infiltrating the teen organization in the Teens Next Door. Decommissioning has also proved reversible via a "re-commissioning" module used four times in the series (once in Operation: E.N.D. and three times in Operation: Z.E.R.O.).

KND agents utilize a vast array of mechanical, electronic gadgets, weapons, and machinery, collectively referred to as 2x4 (two-by-four) technology. The KND's 2x4 technology was originally conceived as being constructed from an assortment of objects, mostly common household ones. However, as the series progressed, the kind of objects their technology was constructed from became bigger, consisting of things such as large vehicles and small buildings. Not only that, but the complexity of their technology, such as their defensive weaponry and means of transportation, advanced to such absurd levels as to be considered science fiction, despite all of it still being constructed from nothing but an assortment of objects.

Storylines
The episodes are titularly presented as the missions of the members of Sector V in the Kids Next Door, denoted as "Operation:" followed by an acronym that can give viewers clues as to what each mission is about. Most episodes are divided into two parts, each with a different mission, while some episodes consist of two directly linked parts with one mission. Usually, the episodes have very little continuity with each other, although occasionally an episode will have a reference to at least one earlier episode and/or lead to consequences in later ones. Season Five's "Operation: O.U.T.B.R.E.A.K." is a direct continuation of the episode "Operation: V.I.R.U.S.", and Season Six's "Operation: S.C.I.E.N.C.E." leads into "Operation: A.M.I.S.H." while another pair of Season Six episodes; "Operation: R.E.C.E.S.S." and "Operation: H.A.M.S.T.E.R.", occur simultaneously, the latter showing what sort of thing transpires while the team is away.

Stories in the earlier episodes were often about typical childhood problems, but magnified and exaggerated. As the series progressed, a more complex and continuous storyline developed. The final season revolved around the mysterious Splinter Cell within the KND itself observing Numbuh One for an unknown assignment, which was concluded in the series finale "Operation: I.N.T.E.R.V.I.E.W.S.".

The show frequently contains references to many films, television series, comic books, anime and manga especially in the later seasons, such as Star Wars, Ghostbusters, Planet of the Apes, Jaws, Jurassic Park, The Lord of the Rings, Godzilla, The Terminator, Spider-Man, Dragon Ball Z, Pokémon, James Bond, Star Trek, Transformers, Harry Potter, Rambo, Alien, The Matrix, X-Men, the Fantastic Four, Predator, RoboCop, Pirates of the Caribbean, 2001: A Space Odyssey, The Godfather, On the Waterfront, Men in Black, Doctor Who, Indiana Jones, and Mission Impossible; with James Bond, Star Trek, and Star Wars being the most prominently referenced in the series.

Production
Warburton created a pilot episode, titled "Diseasy Does It", for another planned show, Kenny and the Chimp, which was to be produced by Hanna-Barbera. Among the planned recurring characters for Kenny and the Chimp was a group of rebellious children known as "Those Kids Next Door", who carried out their mischief from a house next to Kenny's home, and frequently caused trouble for him. The plot-line was then changed to focus on the group of kids alone, and later, the kids battling adulthood. In 2001, the show's pilot episode, "No P in the OOL", which was produced at Cartoon Network Studios, won a Cartoon Network viewer's poll, and as a result, Codename: Kids Next Door was greenlit to become a series, while Kenny and the Chimp was not greenlit by the channel. The character Professor XXXL, who appeared in "Diseasy Does It", became a recurring character in Codename: Kids Next Door after Kenny and the Chimp was not picked up for a series. Despite this, Kenny and Chimpy did make a cameo in "No P In The OOL".

Codename: Kids Next Door was the most popular TV series produced at Curious Pictures, who previously did the work on Sheep in the Big City at Cartoon Network.

Characters

Main characters
 Numbuh 1/Nigel Uno (voiced by Benjamin Diskin) - The leader and head operative of Sector V.
 Numbuh 2/Hogarth Pennywhistle "Hoagie" Gilligan, Jr. (voiced by Diskin) - The best friend of Numbuh 1, the joke-cracking engineer and 2x4 Technology Officer of Sector V.
 Numbuh 3/Kuki Sanban (voiced by Lauren Tom) - The happy-go-lucky tactician and medic of Sector V.
 Numbuh 4/Wallabee "Wally" Beatles (voiced by Dee Bradley Baker) - The brash combatant of Sector V.
 Numbuh 5/Abigail "Abby" Lincoln (voiced by Cree Summer) - The intelligent, relaxed second-in-command/spy of Sector V.

KND Organization
 Numbuh 6/Bradley (vocal effects provided by Dee Bradley Baker) - A skunk that became an honorary member of Sector V after Numbuh 2 and Numbuh 3 saved him in the streets. In "Operation: H.O.S.P.I.T.A.L." Bradley is made into a cyborg to save his life after he gets hit by a car.
 Numbuh 9/Maurice (voiced by Khary Payton) - A former member of Sector V who was reinstated to the Teens Next Door, a special operations group that fake being decommissioned in their 13th birthday, so they can learn information from both adults and teenagers.
 Numbuh 13 (voiced by Billy West) - The Klutz of the KND. While he means well, he is ignorant to the fact that he is incredibly clumsy, klutzy, and moronic. Like the KND's Toiletnator, every sector dreads having to work with him, even his own! The Sector Leader of N, Numbuh 14/Mary-Lou Sara-Jane Jones (voiced by Lauren Tom), has the literal job of being his damage control, which she resents very much.
 Numbuh 60/Patton Drilovsky (voiced by Matt Levin) - A high-ranking operative of the Kids Next Door Arctic Base.
 Numbuh 65.3/Herbie (voiced by Dee Bradley Baker) - The stuffy and nerdy Head Communications Officer of Moonbase. He often hails Sector V for urgent missions. He also has a soft spot for Lizzie Devine.
 Numbuh 83/Sonia (voiced by Janice Kawaye) - The Soda, Snacks, and Treats officer of Sector W, she has an irrational fear of the dark and will go into a blind rage when she is forced towards it.
 Numbuh 84/Lee (voiced by Janice Kawaye) - The tactical Yo-yo Specialist of Sector W.
 Numbuh 86/Fanny Fulbright (voiced by Jennifer Hale) - The Head of Decommissioning and Global Tactical Officer of the KND Organization.
 Numbuh 92 and Numbuh 93 (voiced by Benjamin Diskin and Tara Strong) - Two KND operatives who reside on the Kids Next Door Moonbase. Their roles are effectively replaced with Numbuh 44/Pete and Peter Doblemitz (usually voiced by Lauren Tom), twin operatives who also work as infantry.
 Numbuh 101/Matt (voiced by Ogie Banks) - The Head of the KND Seriously Cool Museum of Artifacts and Stuff. He is a mega fan of Sector V, having made a macaroni statue of Numbuh 5, and even having Numbuh 1's infamous Rainbow Monkey underwear; This can turn them off from him. He is also a huge KND history nut, believing in Sector Z and Numbuh 0 even when others thought that they were just myths.
 Numbuh 362/Rachel McKenzie (voiced by Rachael MacFarlane) - The Supreme Leader of the KND Organization.
 Numbuh 363/Harvey McKenzie (voiced by Jennifer Hale) - The sector leader of Sector W, and the Supreme Leader's younger brother. He is rivaling with Sector V in the series finale, who don't like him very much due to his cockiness and dislike of being touched by others. He was decommissioned months later by Numbuh 5 because she got sick of him not wanting to be touched.
 Numbuh 74.239 and Numbuh Infinity (voiced by Dave Wittenberg and Phil LaMarr respectively) - Two KND operatives who both worked for the Splinter Cell, a shadowy faction of the Kids Next Door. They have manipulated events to sign Numbuh 1 to the Galactic KND.

Villains
 Father/Benedict Wigglestein (voiced by Maurice LaMarche impersonating Kirk Douglas when wearing the silhouette suit, Jeff Bennett without it) - The arch-nemesis of the KND, the main villain of the series, and the 'adoptive' father of the Delightful Children From Down The Lane. He is also Nigel's paternal uncle and Monty's brother. In "Operation: Z.E.R.O.", the aforementioned family relation is revealed, as well as that Father kidnapped the kids formerly known as Sector Z and permanently brainwashed them to become the Delightful Children.
 The Delightful Children From Down the Lane (voiced by Benjamin Diskin, Dee Bradley Baker, and Cree Summer, and by Tom Kenny, Rachael McFarlane, Jason Harris, Dee Bradley Baker, and Cree Summer as Sector Z), five 'delightfulized' kids, and Father's children/henchmen. In "Operation: Z.E.R.O.", they are revealed to be the former members of the missing Sector Z; Bruce (blonde boy with bowl cut), Alessandra (brunette-blond haired girl), David (tall, skinny boy with a comb-over), Lenny (black boy with Football Helmet), and Constance (fat girl with brown hair and pigtails), (clockwise from the front). 'Delightfulization' is shown to be a form of brainwashing throughout the series, with Sector Z's brainwashing being boosted by a blown fuse and thus made permanent. As a result, any attempt to reverse it can only be temporary.
 Cree Lincoln (voiced by Cree Summer) - Numbuh 5's older sister, leader of the Teen Ninjas, and an apprentice to Father. She was originally a KND operative Numbuh 11. While a dangerous foe, Cree does care about her sister and wished that Numbuh 5 joined the teens just like her.
 Chad Dickson (voiced by Jason Harris) - Formerly Numbuh 274, Chad was the supreme leader of the Kids Next Door until it was revealed in "Operation: E.N.D." that he had hidden his thirteenth birthday to the KND and arranged Sector V's decommissioning. Due to his treason he allies with the adults and joined the Teen Ninjas. In "Operation: T.R.E.A.T.Y." it is revealed that he was actually a TND operative working for the Splinter Cell.
 Mr. Boss (voiced by Jeff Bennett) - A corporate executive and the de facto second-in-command of the KND's standard rogues gallery. Mr. Boss is often the one who leads the other KND villains in his plots. In his debut episode, some of Sector V's parents work for him in his office building. In "Operation: D.A.D.D.Y.", it is revealed that he is Numbuh 86's father.
 The Toiletnator/Lou Pottingsworth III (voiced by Dee Bradley Baker) - A toilet-themed incompetent villain, being considered the lamest villain by the KND and by other villains to the point where Mr. Boss quotes "Aw geez, it's the Toiletnator!" when he shows up. He is shown to have toilet based powers as seen within "Operation: C.A.N.Y.O.N.". In a comic spin-off, it is revealed that he is Numbuh 4's long lost uncle.
 Stickybeard (voiced by Mark Hamill) - The candy-loving pirate captain of the Candy Pirates and a rival of Numbuh 5's due to their mutual obsession with sugar. Despite being sour towards the Kids Next Door, he does show a "sweet tooth" such as saving Sector V from the Great White Asparagus (which he loathes more than kids) and helping Numbuh 5 save Heinrich from cursed licorice pirates.
 Knightbrace/Mr. Jelly (voiced by Tom Kenny) - An oral health-themed vigilante who performs painful and unnecessary dental and orthodontic procedures on the children he ambushes. In his debut episode, "Operation T.E.E.T.H.", his true identity is Mr. Jelly, the former owner of a candy shop the KND frequently visit. Mr. Jelly always wanted to be a dentist since he was a child, but was expelled from dental school for attempting to put braces on babies. He was forced to work in his family's candy store, but later became Knightbrace due to being angered at candy harming children's teeth. Despite being ashamed of reluctantly serving sweets to his customers, he likes taffy. 
 The Common Cold (voiced by Tom Kenny) - A sickness-based villain who uses his own snot to render all KND operatives sick so they'll be too weak on stopping other adults plans. At one point, The Common Cold was defeated by Mrs. Gilligan, who used chicken soup on him. He has a niece named Anna Worthington (his sister-in-law's daughter).
 Gramma Stuffum (voiced by Grey DeLisle) - An old lady obsessed with force-feeding her disgusting food to children to make them unable to move so that they can't bother adults. As seen in her debut episode, even the Delightful Children from Down the Lane can't handle her food. She's often accompanied by liver and two giggling onions.
 Count Spankulot (voiced by Daran Norris) - A vampire vigilante who spanks naughty children. Like the Toiletnator, he wants to join a group but his spank addiction always gets him rejected. In "Operation: L.O.C.K.D.O.W.N.", he can actually turn people into spank-happy vampires just by taking off his gloves, similar to a vampire bite, and can only be cured by spanking him back.
 Mr. John Wink and Mr. Timothy Fibb (voiced by Tom Kenny and Dee Bradley Baker respectively) - A pair of villains who use robotic chairs to fight. For unknown reasons, Mr. Wink sports bison horns and Mr. Fibb sports walrus tusks. In "Operation C.O.W.G.I.R.L.", both of them used to be members of Cowboys Kids Club, but Timothy and John became villains due to fellow Cowboy Kids Club member, Lasso Lass, going to the prom with Texas Tommy instead of Timothy. They are a parody of Mr. Wint and Mr. Kidd and address each other in the same manner.
 Crazy Old Cat Lady (voiced by Grey DeLisle) - An old woman with cat-like features who lives with thousands of black and white cats.
 Professor XXXL (voiced by Frank Welker) - A scientist who wants to create the most perfect snow cone that has ever been made. Every time he appears, he gets different animalistic parts in his body. While Professor XXXL doesn't often attack the KND, he does engage in other activities with the other villains.
 Chester (voiced by Tom Kenny) - A greedy man who wants to make money at the expense of children while doing different jobs. Some of his numerous schemes include brainwashing campers for labor while operating as a camp counselor, selling children as burgers to sharks while operating as a fast food worker, and putting Numbuh 1 in a dream with the help of his Happy Headband while operating as a mad scientist.
 Mega Mom and Destructo Dad / Mrs. and Mr. Dickson (voiced by Jeff Bennett and Grey DeLisle) - Numbuh 274's parents that wanted their son to be the best by petrifying the other KND operatives. They were easily defeated when 274 threatens them by quitting every extra curricular activity he's assigned.
 Mr. Fizz (voiced by Jeff Bennett) - A businessman who is the head of the Soda Control Board who "legalize" the age of when children should not drink root beer. He can't stand the sound of children and often drinks soda just to soothe his nerves. If he can't steady his nerves, then he flies into a rage. He also has ansomnia which makes him immune to horrible stenches.
 The Great Puttinski / Rupert Puttkin (voiced by Rob Paulsen) - An arrogant and rude miniature golf champion who takes the sport very seriously. After losing to Numbuh 2, he shrinks him down to size in his basement where he created his own course (all the while to not disturb his mother).
 Senior Citizen Squad (voiced by Candi Milo, Tom Kenny, and Dee Bradley Baker) - A group of senior citizens led by Numbuh 2's grandmother, Lydia Gilligan, who along with her companions, Sheldon and Maurice, use an anti-aging cream that temporarily turns them into teenagers.
 Ice Cream Men (variously voiced by Dee Bradley Baker, Tom Kenny, Daran Norris, and Kevin Michael Richardson) - Ice cream vendors men who operate Ice Cream Trucks and only serve ice cream to adults. They serve mainly as henchmen to the Delightful Children and Mr. Boss while using the Tasty Taste Ice Cream Factory as their base. At one point, the Delightful Children reprimanded them for having a heater in their factory.
 Elite Ice Cream Men (variously voiced by Jess Harnell, Maurice LaMarche, Matt Levin, Daran Norris, and Khary Payton) - A version of the Ice Cream Men that wear ice cream cone-themed armor. They are often in the services of Father.
 Henrietta "Heinrich" Von Marzipan (voiced by Dee Bradley Baker while cursed and Candi Milo while uncursed), Numbuh 5's arch-rival, who travels the world in search of rare candy and will often go to villainous extremes to get it. She hates Numbuh 5 for an unknown past event in Guatemala, eventually explained in "Operation: C.A.R.A.M.E.L.". In the series, she appears to be a boy, but in "Operation: C.A.R.A.M.E.L.", it is revealed that she is actually female, suffering under the effects of a curse, and she and Numbuh 5 reconcile with each other after she is helped to become her true self again.
 James Nixon McGarfield (voiced by Tom Kenny) - McGarfield was the Fourth Grade President-for-life of Gallagher Elementary until it was revealed that he allied with Father and began abusing his power until "Operation: S.N.O.W.I.N.G." when he was defeated for holding an assembly on a snow day. His name is a reference to previous presidents involved in scandals and disasters, Richard Nixon, James A. Garfield, William McKinley, and James Buchanan.
Laura Limpin / The Big Badolescent (voiced by Grey DeLisle in normal form, Dee Bradley Baker in teen form) - A little girl who has a "condition" that turns her into a hulking monster when she gets angry, she'll eventually calm down when she gets her way.
 The Six-Gum Gang (voiced by Jennifer Hale, Tom Kenny, Benjamin Diskin, and Dee Bradley Baker) - A gang of child robbers who worked for the Delightful Children to steal other children's homework and pass it off as their own.
 The Interesting Twins From Beneath The Mountain - Two Japanese twins consisting of an unnamed boy (voiced by Tom Kenny) and a girl (voiced by Tara Strong in "Operation: T.R.I.P.", Jennifer Hale in "Operation: R.E.C.R.U.I.T.") who worked for Father, with facepaint similar to the Yin and Yang symbol. Although the two are masters of disguise and espioange, they tend to suffer a lot of misfortunes and setbacks. In "Operation: T.R.I.P.", they were following Numbuh 3 on her trip to Japan to infiltrate the home base of the Japanese Kids Next Door and unleash a team of ninjas on them. The Twins would later appear in "Operation R.E.C.R.U.I.T." to infiltrate the Kids Next Door headquarters by posing as a boy named "Bobby" only to fail as Sector V knew of their schemes. 
 King Sandy (voiced by James Arnold Taylor) - An average little kid that always portrays himself as a tyrannical king and hates being told that he's pretending, he is escorted with the Knights of the Round Towel (who are actually his cousins). He once tried to make Numbuh 3 his queen, but not before he sets his eyes on her little sister Mushi.
 Grandfather (voiced by Neil Ross) - Monty and Benedict's father who is the main antagonist in "Operation: Z.E.R.O.". His main goal was to turn all children and adults into obedient elderly zombies to reclaim dominion across the world, he was successfully defeated by the recommissioned Numbuh 0 by placing both Grandfather and himself in the Decommissioning Chamber which erased their memories.
 Ernest (voiced by Dave Wittenberg) - Ernest is the leader of the bullies who commissions underground sports involving kids to misbehave. He first ran "Bully-Fights" (similar to the real bullfighting sport) in Operation: M.A.T.A.D.O.R where he tricks innocent fathers into signing up for a "How to be a Better Dad Seminar" and hook them up on caffeine causing them to behave like angry Spanish Bulls. Numbuh Four enjoyed the sport but he immediately hated the idea when forced to fight his dad, who was brainwashed. After the "Bully Fights" were sabotaged, Ernest commissioned "Vaseball", a version of baseball, where children use pottery, glass and other breakable objects as baseballs. This, however, was a ploy by Ernest and his gang of bullies to get the kids grounded so no one could tattle on them while the bullies go vandalizing every house in the neighborhood. Although successful in getting the kids grounded, minus Numbuh Four, he and the bullies gets grounded themselves. His name is a reference to Ernest Hemingway, who was a fan of Spanish Bullfighting.

Other characters
 Lizzie Devine (voiced by Grey DeLisle) - Numbuh 1's girlfriend and then later ex-girlfriend; they broke up at the end of the season 6 episode, "Operation: G.I.R.L.F.R.I.E.N.D.".
 Numbuh 0/Montgomery "Monty" Uno (voiced by Frank Welker in as an adult, Dave Wittenberg as a child, or Numbuh 0) - Numbuh 1's father. He is later revealed to have started the Seventh Age of the KND after defeating Grandfather.
 Mrs. Uno (voiced by Jennifer Hale) - Numbuh 1's mother and Father's sister-in-law. In "Operation: I.N.T.E.R.V.I.E.W.S.", it is revealed that she was originally a KND operative Numbuh 999, and was the first female operative of the Seventh Age.
 Betty Gilligan (voiced by Candi Milo) - Numbuh 2's mother.
 Thomas "Tommy" Gilligan (voiced by Dee Bradley Baker) - Numbuh 2's little brother. In "Operation: G.R.A.D.U.A.T.E.S.", he temporarily becomes a KND operative "Numbuh T" until he resigns himself from the code module, and becomes a vigilante going by the alias of "The Tommy".
 Kani Sanban (voiced by Keone Young) - Numbuh 3's father.
 Genki Sanban (voiced by Lauren Tom) - Numbuh 3's mother.
 Mushi Sanban (voiced by Tara Strong), Numbuh 3's little sister. In season 4, she later becomes a villain after "murdering" her sister's new Rainbow Monkey out of jealousy, later she kidnaps Count Spankulot to create Spankenstine as revenge towards Numbuh 2.
 Sydney Beatles (voiced by Jeff Bennett) - Numbuh 4's father.
 Mrs. Beatles (voiced by Jennifer Hale) - Numbuh 4's mother.
 Joey Beatles (vocal effects provided by Dee Bradley Baker) - Numbuh 4's baby brother. He is surprisingly powerful and witty for being only a baby, defeating multiple villains.
 Dr. Lincoln (voiced by Kevin Michael Richardson impersonating Bill Cosby) - Numbuh 5's father who is inspired by Cliff Huxtable from The Cosby Show due to the fact that they both work as doctors. He used to work as a clown, until his co-worker messed up his joke, ruining their careers. Unlike the other parents, Dr. Lincoln's face is never shown (except in clown makeup).
 Mrs. Lincoln (voiced by Cree Summer) - Numbuh 5's mother.

Episodes

There are six seasons, each with 13 episodes (two half-length episodes counting as one), adding up to 78 episodes altogether. There have been two TV movies, the first taking place between the second and third episodes of season 6 (Operation: Z.E.R.O.), and the second at the end of season 6 (Operation: I.N.T.E.R.V.I.E.W.S.), which serves as the series finale.

Reception

Awards and nominations
In 2005, the series won the Best Television Series for Children Award at the Ottawa International Animation Festival for "Operation: A.R.C.H.I.V.E.", which was written by Mr. Warburton and Mo Willems and storyboarded by Guy Moore and Quack Leard.

The following year, "Operation: L.I.C.O.R.I.C.E." won the Festival's Collideascope Award for Television Animation for Children.

Broadcast
 Cartoon Network (December 2002–2008; 2009–2014)
 Kids' WB (2004)
 Boomerang (February 2017–March 2017; January 2, 2018 – May 27, 2019, June 8, 2021 – present)

Other media

Home media
Two DVDs in two volumes were released, of the series, totaling sixteen episodes by Warner Home Video. The entire series is available on digital purchase in six seasons. On May 30, 2019, the entire series, except for the "Operation: Z.E.R.O." TV movie, was added to the Boomerang streaming service and its VRV channel.

In other series or works
On an episode of The Grim Adventures of Billy & Mandy entitled "Sickly Sweet", a scene depicts Grim watching Codename: Kids Next Door. Also, in Billy & Mandy's Big Boogey Adventure, Numbuh Three makes a cameo as Grim's replacement. Numbuh Two also made a cameo in "Billy & Mandy Moon the Moon". Also, in the MAD episode "Taking Nemo / Once Upon a Toon", Numbuh One makes a cameo as one of the cartoon characters who have forgotten his identity. The show was also referenced in the New Boyz song "Tough Kids". In the 2004 film Sideways, the show is playing on Miles' mother's television set. The Delightful Children from Down the Lane were reviewed on the Orientation Videos for Villains of Villainous "The Lost Cases of the Treehouse". Numbuh Five made a cameo in the OK K.O.! Let's Be Heroes episode "Crossover Nexus". In the Craig of the Creek episode "Kelsey the Elder", Barry mentions this show.

Publications
Stories featuring the Kids Next Door have been featured in the comic series Cartoon Cartoons, Cartoon Network Block Party, and Cartoon Network Action Pack from DC Comics. The characters are also featured in the books 2x4 Technology Handbook and Sooper Secrets and Boomerang Bloopers, both by Benjamin Alison Wilgus. The characters appeared in a one-shot tie-in for Cartoon Network and IDW's Super Secret Crisis War crossover comic in 2014.

Trading cards
A trading card game based on the series was launched by Wizards of the Coast in July 2005.

Video games
Two video games were released for the series: Operation: S.O.D.A. in 2004 for the Game Boy Advance and Operation: V.I.D.E.O.G.A.M.E. in 2005 for PlayStation 2, Xbox, and GameCube. Several browser games were also released on the Cartoon Network website. The MMORPG style game Operation: B.E.S.T. was playable for a brief time in 2005, but was shut down shortly thereafter.

In Cartoon Network Universe: FusionFall, Numbuhs One through Five, and villains Father, Toiletnator, and Stickybeard appear as non-playable characters. KNDefense armor and 2x4 Tech weapons are available for players, Sector V's treehouse can be explored, and KND S.C.A.M.P.E.R.s can be used for transport. In Cartoon Network: Punch Time Explosion, Father and Numbuh 1 are playable, Sector V Treehouse and the C.O.O.L.-B.U.S. are arenas, and Numbuh 2 and Stickybeard are assisted characters. In the console versions, Toiletnator is a playable character, Numbuh 4 is an assist character, and KND Moonbase is an arena.

Possible sequel and possible spin-off
On January 31, 2008, during a Q&A session on LiveJournal, when Tom Warburton was asked if "Operation: I.N.T.E.R.V.I.E.W.S." was in fact the true finale of Codename: KND, Warburton said that it was not necessarily meant to be the finale, stating that a revival could be made in the future.

Warburton had unsuccessfully pitched a Galactic: Kids Next Door spin-off several times to Cartoon Network executives, and at one point he considered making a TV movie as a pilot for the potential spin-off series. Following having no response, Warburton eventually decided to create a pitch that would be distributed over the internet pseudonymously to try and get the series approved with help from fans. Warburton wrote the script and collaborated with others who had worked on the series to produce an animatic-style pitch. On March 19, 2015, the animatic was released, entitled Galactic: Kids Next Door. On April 1, 2015, a fan-made petition was started on Change.org to make G:KND a real series, was signed by Warburton himself and Dee Bradley Baker. Rat Animation also showed interest in the project. Warburton later noted that the executives at Cartoon Network had noticed the response but were not interested in a continuation to KND, though he remained confident to get the sequel approved in the future.

Notes

References

External links

 Codename: Kids Next Door at Curious Pictures
 
 

 
2000s American animated television series
2002 American television series debuts
2008 American television series endings
American children's animated action television series
American children's animated adventure television series
American children's animated comedy television series
American children's animated fantasy television series
Animated television series about children
Child superheroes
Television series by Curious Pictures
Espionage television series
English-language television shows
Cartoon Network original programming
Fictional military organizations
Television shows set in the United States
Television shows set in Virginia
Fictional secret agents and spies
Television shows adapted into films
Television shows adapted into comics
Television shows adapted into video games
Cartoon Cartoons
Elementary school television series